Radko Mutafchiyski (born 11 May 1989) is a Bulgarian footballer who plays as a defender.

References

External links

1989 births
Living people
Footballers from Sofia
Bulgarian footballers
Bulgarian expatriate footballers
FC Chavdar Etropole players
Akademik Sofia players
FK Horizont Turnovo players
FC Vitosha Bistritsa players
Expatriate footballers in North Macedonia
Expatriate footballers in Greece
Bulgarian expatriate sportspeople in Greece
First Professional Football League (Bulgaria) players
Second Professional Football League (Bulgaria) players
Football League (Greece) players
Association football defenders
Bulgarian expatriate sportspeople in North Macedonia